Below are the winners for the 2012 African-American film Critics Associations.

Winners

Best Picture:
1. Zero Dark Thirty (Winner)
2. Argo
3. Lincoln
4. Middle of Nowhere
5. Life of Pi
6. Les Misérables
7. Django Unchained
8. Beasts of the Southern Wild
9. Moonrise Kingdom
10. Think Like a Man

Special Achievement: Billy Dee Williams & Cicely Tyson

References 

 https://scriptmag.com/news/african-american-film-critics-association-best-screenplay-ava-duvernay-middle-of-nowhere

African-American Film Critics Association Awards
2012 film awards